Desperate Search is a 1952 American adventure film directed by Joseph H. Lewis from a novel by Arthur Mayse. It stars Howard Keel, Jane Greer, Patricia Medina and Keenan Wynn in a drama revolving around two lost children in the Canadian north.

Plot
After taking off from Vancouver, a Canadian Western Airways Douglas DC-3 airliner catches on fire and crashes in the Canadian north. On board are two young children, Don (Lee Aaker) and Janet Heldon (Linda Lowell), ultimately the only survivors.

Their father, pilot Vince Heldon (Howard Keel) and his wife Julie (Jane Greer) join forces with the family friend, bush pilot "Brandy" (Keenan Wynn) and Nora Stead (Patricia Medina), the children's mother (from an earlier, but unsuccessful marriage) to mount a desperate aerial search before incoming bad weather arrives.

Tensions mount as the children face the danger of exposure and a mountain lion that begins to track them while the searchers themselves are in conflict as the hotshot pilot Stead creates problems with her constant efforts to take over the search.

A final effort sees a reconciliation and a successful rescue in the nick of time.

Cast

 Howard Keel as Vince Heldon
 Jane Greer as Julie Heldon
 Patricia Medina as Nora Stead
 Keenan Wynn as "Brandy"
 Robert Burton as Wayne Langmuir
 Lee Aaker as Don Heldon
 Linda Lowell as Janet Heldon
 Michael Duganas Lou
 Elaine Stewart as Stewardess
 Jonathan Cott as Detective
 Jeff Richards as Ed
 Dick Simmons as Communicator (Vancouver Radio)

Production

As an example of MGM's effort to create a streamlined, low-budget drama, the action in Desperate Search was pared down to the essential dramatic elements of a search for downed children. Although authentic "props" were used, including the fictional Canadian Western Airways Douglas DC-3, most of the aerial scenes were stock footage. The use of an aircraft painted as "CF-HGO" allowed the studio to merge aerial footage of the prototype Noorduyn Norseman which first flew on November 14, 1935, and was subsequently hired by Warner Brothers in the summer of 1941 for the filming of  Captains of the Clouds in the North Bay area of Ontario and carried the temporary registration, "CF-HGO" during the filming.

Although the director, Joseph H. Lewis was offered the opportunity to do location shooting, almost all of the film takes place on MGM's back lot. Selected scenes of the earlier Captains of the Clouds  film are used, matching the action shot on the studio stage.

Reception
Variety called Desperate Search "strictly a routine offering" but praised Lewis's directing skill, which "hammers home as much tension and suspense as possible." A later-day review similarly noted the taut story and excellent portrayals by the leads but also described the child actors as being the key to film, with Lee Aaker's acting a stand-out while Linda Lowell "gives a one-note performance which consists mostly of screaming at the top of her lungs."

According to MGM's records the film earned $465,000 in the US and Canada and $242,000 elsewhere, resulting in a loss of $88,000.

References

Notes

Citations

Bibliography

 Mauro, Rudy. "Captains of the Clouds: Filming the Bush Flying Sequences of Canada's First Air Epic." Journal of the Canadian Aviation Historical Society, Vol. 29, No. 3, Fall 1991.
 Mauro, Rudy. "Captains of the Clouds: A Postscript." Journal of the Canadian Aviation Historical Society, Vol. 33, No. 1, Spring 1995.
 Medina Cotten, Patricia. Laid Back in Hollywood: Remembering. Los Angeles: Belle Publishing, 1998. .

External links
 
 
 
 

1952 films
American black-and-white films
Metro-Goldwyn-Mayer films
Northern (genre) films
1952 adventure films
Films directed by Joseph H. Lewis
American aviation films
American adventure films
1950s English-language films
1950s American films
Films about cougars